The Haval H4 is a compact Crossover sport utility vehicle produced by Great Wall Motor under the Haval marque from 2017 to 2020.

Overview

Debuting on the 2017 Guangzhou Auto Show, the Haval H4 was positioned between the Haval H2 subcompact crossover and the slightly larger Haval H6 compact crossover.

Prices of the Haval H4 ranges from 79,000 to 116,000 yuan at launch.

Powertrain
Power of the Haval H4 is provided two small four-cylinder engines. Engine options are a 1.3-litre producing 102kW and 225Nm and a 1.5-litre turbo petrol engine producing 124kW and 285Nm.

Interior
The interior of the H4 features a 12-inch center display, and a large driver display behind the steering wheel. Safety equipment includes a 360-degree camera system, lane-departure warning, lane-change assist, tyre-pressure monitoring and parking sensors at the front and rear of the vehicle.

References

External links

H4
Compact sport utility vehicles
Crossover sport utility vehicles
Front-wheel-drive vehicles
Cars of China
2010s cars